Kraljica smrti (trans. Queen of Death) is the fifth and the last studio album by Yugoslav rock band Gordi, released in 1982.

Kraljica smrti is the band's second heavy metal album, and is, alongside their previous album, Pakleni trio (Hell Trio), considered a milestone on the Yugoslav heavy metal scene. Gordi ended their activity two years after the album release, the band's leader Zlatko Manojlović starting a successful solo career.

Track listing
All songs written by Zlatko Manojlović.

Personnel
Zlatko Manojlović - vocals, guitar, producer
Slobodan Svrdlan - bass guitar
Čedomir Petrović - drums

Additional personnel
Rade Ercegovac - recorded by
Veselin Maldaner - recording assistant
Vojkan Potulić - artwork, graphic design

2007 reissue
Kraljica smrti was rereleased by Rock Express Records in 2007. The reissue featured video recordings of the songs "Lova", "Blefer" i "Veštice, đavoli" from a 1982 concert. It also featured digital photo gallery, band biography, lyrics and wallpaper.

Legacy
In 2021 the song "Veštice, đavoli" was ranked 90th on the list of 100 Greatest Yugoslav Hard & Heavy Anthems by web magazine Balkanrock.

References 

Kraljica smrti at Discogs

External links
Kraljica smrti at Discogs

Gordi (band) albums
1982 albums
Jugoton albums